Andrés Molteni and Adil Shamasdin were the defending champions, but Shamasdin chose to play in Geneva instead. Molteni played alongside Guillermo Durán but lost in the second round to Nick Kyrgios and Jack Sock.

Kyrgios and Sock went on to win the title, defeating Roman Jebavý and Matwé Middelkoop in the final, 7–5, 2–6, [11–9].

Seeds

Draw

Draw

External links
 Main draw

2018 ATP World Tour
2018 Doubles
2018 in French tennis